I Stand Accused is a 1938 American drama film directed by John H. Auer and written by Gordon Kahn and Alex Gottlieb. The film stars Robert Cummings, Helen Mack, Lyle Talbot, Thomas Beck, Gordon Jones and Robert Paige. The film was released by Republic Pictures.

Plot
Two boyhood friends, Fred and Paul, become lawyers. Fred goes to work for criminals while Paul remains honest.

Cast 
Robert Cummings as	Frederick A. Davis
Helen Mack as Alison Cooper
Lyle Talbot as Charles Eastman
Thomas Beck as Paul V. Reynolds
Gordon Jones as Blackie
Robert Paige as Joe Benson
Leona Roberts as Mrs. Davis
Robert Middlemass as Norman L. Mitchell
Thomas E. Jackson as Detective Gilroy
John Hamilton as Defense Attorney Brower
Howard Hickman as Gilbert
Harry Stubbs as Mr. Moss
Robert Strange as Francis X. Ryan

Production
it was based on the career of lawyer Dixie Davis.

Robert Cummings had been dropped by Paramount Studios in September 1938 and found himself in less demand as an actor. "I was poison," he later said. "Not an agent would look at me." But he managed to get cast in the lead of this film. His casting was announced in September 1938.

Reception
Cummings said the film was "a fluke hit. So at least I could get inside the casting agents again."

References

External links
 

I Stand Accused at BFI

1938 films
1930s English-language films
American drama films
1938 drama films
Republic Pictures films
Films directed by John H. Auer
American black-and-white films
1930s American films